Dizaj (also Romanized as Dīzaj; also known as Dizeh) is a village in Ojarud-e Gharbi Rural District, in the Central District of Germi County, Ardabil Province, Iran. At the 2006 census, its population was 761, in 163 families.

References 

Towns and villages in Germi County